The 2014 Australian motorcycle Grand Prix was the sixteenth round of the 2014 Grand Prix motorcycle racing season. It was held at the Phillip Island Grand Prix Circuit in Phillip Island on 19 October 2014.

In his 250th premier class start, Valentino Rossi took his second victory of the season, after benefitting from an accident for Marc Márquez, while he was leading the race. It was Rossi's sixth win at the circuit, after five successive wins from 2001 to 2005. Second place went to Rossi's teammate Jorge Lorenzo, while Tech 3's Bradley Smith finished in third place, recording his first premier class podium, after Ducati's Cal Crutchlow crashed out late on. As a result, it was the first all-Yamaha podium since the 2008 French Grand Prix and the first time since the 2011 Australian Grand Prix where all three riders on the podium were of the same manufacturer. For the first time since the 2009 Dutch TT, both Repsol Honda riders failed to finish the race; further to Márquez's accident, Dani Pedrosa collided with Andrea Iannone, causing both riders to retire from the race. Karel Abraham, Stefan Bradl and Pol Espargaró also crashed out of the race, and only 14 of the 23 starters reached the finish.

In the support categories, Maverick Viñales took his third win of the season in Moto2, ahead of Thomas Lüthi and championship leader Esteve Rabat. In Moto3, Jack Miller took his fifth win of the season on home soil, in a photo finish; he finished just clear of Estrella Galicia 0,0 teammates Álex Márquez (the championship leader) and Álex Rins. The top six riders were covered by just under a quarter of a second at the finish.

Classification

MotoGP

Moto2

Moto3

Championship standings after the race (MotoGP)
Below are the standings for the top five riders and constructors after round sixteen has concluded.

Riders' Championship standings

Constructors' Championship standings

 Note: Only the top five positions are included for both sets of standings.

References

2014 MotoGP race reports
Motorcycle Grand Prix
Australian motorcycle Grand Prix
Motorsport at Phillip Island
Australian motorcycle Grand Prix